The 2014 Jacksonville State Gamecocks football team represented Jacksonville State University as a member of the Ohio Valley Conference (OVC) during the 2014 NCAA Division I FCS football season. Led by first-year head coach John Grass, the Gamecocks compiled an overall record of 10–2 with a mark of 8–0 in conference play, winning the OVC title. Jacksonville State received the OVC's automatic bid to the NCAA Division I Football Championship playoffs. After a first-round bye, the Gamecocks lost in the second round to Sam Houston State. The team played home games at Burgess–Snow Field at JSU Stadium in Jacksonville, Alabama.

Schedule

Game summaries

@ Michigan State

In their first game of the season, the Gamecocks lost, 45–7 to the Michigan State Spartans.

@ Chattanooga

In their second game of the season, the Gamecocks won, 26–23, in overtime, over the Chattanooga Mocs.

West Alabama

In their third game of the season, the Gamecocks won, 45–34 over the West Alabama Tigers.

@ Murray State

In their fourth game of the season, the Gamecocks won, 52–28 over the Murray State Racers.

UT Martin

In their fifth game of the season, the Gamecocks won, 38–14 over the UT Martin Skyhawks.

@ Tennessee State Tigers

In their sixth game of the season, the Gamecocks won, 27–20 over the Tennessee State Tigers.

Tennessee Tech

In their seventh game of the season, the Gamecocks won, 49–3 over the Tennessee Tech Golden Eagles.

Austin Peay

In their eighth game of the season, the Gamecocks won, 56–0 over the Austin Peay Governors.

@ Eastern Kentucky

In their ninth game of the season, the Gamecocks won, 20–6 over the Eastern Kentucky Colonels.

Eastern Illinois

In their tenth game of the season, the Gamecocks won, 27–20 over the Eastern Illinois Panthers.

@ Southeast Missouri State

In their eleventh game of the season, the Gamecocks won, 49–30 over the Southeast Missouri State Redhawks.

Sam Houston State—NCAA Division I Second Round

In their twelfth game of the season, the Gamecocks lost, 37–26 to the Sam Houston State Bearkats in their 2014 FCS Second Round playoff game.

Ranking movements

References

Jacksonville State
Jacksonville State Gamecocks football seasons
Ohio Valley Conference football champion seasons
Jacksonville State
Jacksonville State Gamecocks football